Rodrigo Díaz (born 16 November 1978) is a Colombian equestrian. He competed in the individual jumping event at the 2012 Summer Olympics.

References

External links
 

1978 births
Living people
Colombian male equestrians
Olympic equestrians of Colombia
Equestrians at the 2012 Summer Olympics
Equestrians at the 2011 Pan American Games
Sportspeople from Bogotá
Pan American Games competitors for Colombia
20th-century Colombian people
21st-century Colombian people